The 2008 Coupe Internationale de Nice was the 13th edition of an annual international figure skating competition held in Nice, France. It was held between October 15 and 19, 2008. Skaters competed in the disciplines of men's singles, ladies singles, and pair skating on the levels of senior, junior, and novice.

Senior results

Men

Ladies

Pairs

Junior results

Men

Ladies

Novice results

Boys

Girls

External links
 
 13ème Coupe Internationale de Patinage de la Ville de Nice

Coupe Internationale de Nice
Coupe Internationale De Nice, 2008